Kombat (lit. battalion commander) is a black-and-white photograph by the Soviet photographer Max Alpert. It depicts a Soviet military officer armed with a TT pistol who is raising his unit for an attack during World War II. This work is regarded as one of the most iconic Soviet World War II photographs, yet neither the date nor the subject is known with certainty. According to the most widely accepted version, the photograph depicts junior politruk , minutes before his death on 12 July 1942, in Luhansk Oblast (then called Voroshilovgrad Oblast), Ukraine.

History
Over the years, Alpert gave several contradictory versions of the event, with dates ranging from autumn 1941 to 1943. Alpert was consistent in that he did not know the officer's name and that the photograph's title Kombat ('commander of a battalion') was likely inaccurate – after he took it, he overheard that "the kombat is killed" and tentatively associated this message with the subject of the photograph. After the war, Alpert received numerous letters claiming identification of the officer, but only one was confirmed by a joint investigation by Komsomolskaya Pravda and administration of Luhansk Oblast undertaken in the 1970s. According to this reconstructed version, Yeryomenko was the political commissar in his unit. When the commander was wounded, he took command and raised the unit for a counterattack against the German offence. He died within minutes after that.

Legacy
The photograph was reused in numerous publications, sculptures, artworks and commercial products, both in the Soviet Union and abroad.

 Relief on the Alley of Military Glory in Zaporizhzhia, created based on the famous photograph.
 An image of a political instructor, based on this photo, was the emblem of Donetsk Higher Military-Political School of Engineering and Signal Corps and other military and political schools of the Soviet Union.
 The image was used on a postage stamp of the Republic of Congo in 1985, dedicated to the 40th anniversary of the Victory Day
 In Chelyabinsk, the image was used to create metal bas-relief in memory of the victory in the Great Patriotic War. The bas-relief is located at the end of a nine-story residential building at Molodogvardeytsev Street, house 48; at the intersection of Molodogvardeytsev and Victory Avenue. During the construction of additional buildings to the complex in the late 1990s, the bas was dismantled and in its place a new, slightly different one was installed.

References

Black-and-white photographs
World War II photographs
Portrait photographs
1942 photographs
1940s photographs